Freakshow is a fictional character appearing in American comic books published by Marvel Comics. The character was created by Chris Claremont for the third installment of the series Excalibur. He is one of the few survivors of the island of Genosha which was destroyed by the wild Sentinel attacks commissioned by Cassandra Nova.

Fictional character biography
He is one of the few survivors of the island of Genosha after the Sentinel attacks on the capital of Hammer Bay. Freakshow is the traveling companion of Wicked and becomes an unofficial pupil of Professor X. He soon proved his usefulness in dispatching a skirmish between the Professor and the local bully Unus the Untouchable. Knowing that he couldn't do anything to harm Unus, Xavier had Freakshow swallow the man whole. Because of Unus' natural force field he was unharmed, albeit shaken when Freakshow vomited him up later.

He helps Wicked survive an attack by Magistrates, military forces who were once the murderous law-enforcement arm of the Genoshan government.

During their efforts to rebuild Genosha, Freakshow takes on a worm-like form and digests the debris of many shattered buildings to turn it into arable land.

After the events of the House of M, Freakshow is revealed to be one of the many mutants to lose his abilities as a result of the Scarlet Witch's decimation. He has been seen with a number of Genoshan mutants, including Unus the Untouchable and Wicked. In Son of M #5, (June 2006) the traveling mutant Quicksilver convinces him to try the mutagenic compound called the Terrigen Mists, which had been stolen from the Inhumans. Freakshow regains his powers, but for some time, he is unable to change out of his large, monstrous form. While trapped like this, he and the other Genosha mutants are drawn into battle with the Inhumans, who are tracking down Quicksilver. Some time after, the effects of the mist wear off.

Powers and abilities

Freakshow is a megamorph with the ability to transform his body into a variety of monstrous forms with unique abilities (such as a dragon form capable of flight and fire breathing). While in these forms he has enhanced strength, speed, stamina, and resistance to injury, along with the special characteristics of each form. He has also been shown to take on humanoid forms, specifically an armored form akin to Colossus and a mythological NordicTroll. In all of these forms, Freakshow is still capable of human speech.

Another Freakshow
In X-Force #101, a young mutant known as Kevin, nicknamed Freakshow, nearly fell to his death when attempting to impress others his age by proving that he could fly. This occurs when the High Evolutionary temporarily eliminates all mutant abilities.

External links
Uncannyxmen.net character bio on Freakshow

Characters created by Aaron Lopresti
Characters created by Chris Claremont
Comics characters introduced in 2004
Genoshans
Marvel Comics characters who are shapeshifters
Marvel Comics characters who can move at superhuman speeds
Marvel Comics characters with superhuman strength
Marvel Comics male superheroes
Marvel Comics mutants
Fictional characters with superhuman durability or invulnerability
Fictional monsters